Shayne Smith (born 12 June 1975) is a former Australian rules footballer who played with the Sydney Swans in the Australian Football League (AFL).

A key forward, Smith was drafted from TAC Cup side the Southern Stingrays. He played only four senior games for Sydney, all in the 1994 AFL season.

Smith was a prolific forward for Springvale in the Victorian Football League. His goal tally of 470 is a club record. In 1997 he kicked 107 goals, to become the first player since Jamie Shaw in 1990 to score a century of goals in a season. He won the VFL Leading Goal-kicker award that year and again in 1998.

References

External links
 
 

1975 births
Australian rules footballers from Victoria (Australia)
Sydney Swans players
Dandenong Stingrays players
Casey Demons players
Living people